Erekle Mukhranbatoni (1666–1723) was a Georgian nobleman of the House of Mukhrani, a collateral branch of the royal Bagrationi dynasty of Kartli. He was Prince (batoni) of Mukhrani and ex officio commander of the Banner of Shida Kartli and Grand Master of the Household (msakhurt-ukhutsesi) at the court of Kartli from 1717 to 1719.

Erekle was a son of Constantine I, Prince of Mukhrani, by his wife Darejan Abashidze. He was involved in internecine fighting which followed the forced detention of Vakhtang VI of Kartli in Safavid Iran. Eventually, Erekle was dispossessed of his offices and blinded at the order of Vakhtang's son Prince Bakar. Mukhrani was turned over to Erekle's relative, Levan.

Erekle was married to a princess of the Kherkheulidze family. They had two sons:
 Mamuka (died 1736) 
 David (died 1729)

References 

1666 births
1723 deaths
House of Mukhrani
17th-century people from Georgia (country)
18th-century people from Georgia (country)